Gregory Eli Pyle (April 25, 1949 – October 26, 2019) was an American politician who was a long-term political leader of the Choctaw Nation of Oklahoma. He was elected as Principal Chief in 1997 and re-elected since by wide margins, reigning for almost 17 years. He resigned effective April 28, 2014. Prior to serving as Principal Chief, he had served as Assistant Chief for 13 years. He began to work for the Choctaw Nation in 1975 as a personnel officer.

Chief of the Choctaw Nation of Oklahoma
Pyle was sworn in on June 9, 1997 as Chief of the Choctaw Nation. He promised to see that all Congressional actions continued  to be closely monitored and that the tribe has a direct input into all legislative acts that affect the Choctaw.

Chief Pyle announced his resignation from office at a party to celebrate his 65th birthday, with an effective date of April 28, 2014. Gary Batton, Assistant Chief under Pyle, assumed the role of Chief of the Choctaw Nation.

Chief Pyle died on October 26, 2019, at his home in the Choctaw Nation, aged 70, of unknown causes.

Public service
 1982 – Hired as Personnel Officer
 1982 – Appointed to Arkansas Riverbed Board
 1983 – Became Tribal Program Monitor to oversee and assure contract compliance of all federally funded programs being run by the tribe.
 Testified before Congress for the Arkansas Riverbed case, which was won by the Choctaw, Cherokee and Chickasaw nations.
 1984 – Elected as Assistant Chief of the Choctaw Nation
 Appointed by Secretary of Interior Manuel Lujan Jr. to serve on a national Task Force to reorganize the Bureau of Indian Affairs. Two years later reappointed by Secretary of Interior Bruce Babbitt and headed up several subcommittees on the Task Force.
 1994 – Appointed to the Inter Tribal Council of the Five Civilized Tribes.
 1996 – Served as the President of the Oklahoma Area Health Board and was also a member of the National Health Board.
 1997 – Served on Board of Directors of Landmark Bank and Durant Chamber of Commerce.

References

"A Brief History of the Choctaw Nation", retrieved 08/26/07

1949 births
2019 deaths
Native American Christians
Choctaw Nation of Oklahoma politicians
Oklahoma Democrats
People from Durant, Oklahoma
People from Fort Bragg, California
People from Hugo, Oklahoma
20th-century Native Americans
21st-century Native Americans